Fernando James Ferrer (born April 30, 1950) is an American politician who was the borough president of The Bronx from 1987 to 2001. Ferrer was a candidate for mayor of New York City in 1997 and 2001 and was the Democratic Party nominee for mayor in 2005, when he was defeated by Michael Bloomberg. Ferrer served on the New York City Council in the 1980s and has served as chairman and vice chairman of the Metropolitan Transportation Authority.

Early life and education
Ferrer grew up in the Longwood section of the South Bronx. He graduated from Catholic schools in the Bronx: St. Anselm Elementary School and Cardinal Spellman High School. Ferrer earned his B.A. degree from the University Heights Campus of New York University and his M.P.A. from Baruch College.

Career

New York City Council
Ferrer represented the former 13 City Council district in the Bronx from 1982 to 1987. Ferrer authored legislation requiring interpreters in city emergency rooms. Ferrer went on to chair the Health Committee, fight for anti-discrimination laws on behalf of gays and lesbians, and lead the fight for a Civilian Complaint Review Board for the NYPD.

Bronx Borough President 
Ferrer was appointed Bronx Borough President as the result of incumbent Stanley Simon's resignation in connection with the Wedtech scandal. In 1987, Simon, aware that he had been under investigation and that charges against him were pending, resigned from his post. Ferrer began his 14-year tenure as Bronx borough president when the borough was a symbol of urban decay and neglect. National attention led to a federal commitment to rebuild. During the Ferrer administration housing was created for about 66,000 families. The borough saw a significant drop in crime, particularly in the South Bronx neighborhood, and a steady rise in business and real estate investment.

Campaigns for Mayor of New York City

1997 mayoral campaign 

In 1997, Ferrer launched a campaign for Mayor of New York. Trailing in the polls and under increased pressure from party insiders for a unified Democratic Party, he abruptly dropped out and endorsed the eventual Democratic nominee, Manhattan Borough President Ruth Messinger.

2001 mayoral campaign 

In the 2001 election, Ferrer ran for the Democratic nomination for mayor. He won the first primary with 34%, but failed to win the necessary 40% to secure the nomination and ultimately lost a divisive runoff election to Mark Green following the September 11th terrorist attack on the World Trade Center towers. Ferrer, who is of Puerto Rican descent, received a high level of support from Hispanic voters but not from African-Americans.

2005 mayoral campaign 

Ferrer was the Democratic candidate for mayor in 2005.

Ferrer's campaign was hurt by remarks he made in March 2005 concerning the Amadou Diallo shooting. Ferrer, who'd marched in protest against the shooting when it occurred and had gotten arrested, expressed his belief to the New York City Police Department Sergeants Benevolent Association that the incident was a "tragedy," but "not a crime."  He was strongly criticized by Diallo's family and others for these remarks, and he slid in popularity polls, especially among African-Americans.

Ferrer prevailed in the primary election held on September 13, 2005. The first tally indicated that Ferrer garnered 39.95% of the final vote. He needed 40% to avoid a runoff, but Anthony D. Weiner, the second-place finisher, conceded, thus ensuring that Ferrer would advance to the general election. A final count indicated that Ferrer actually received 40.15% of the votes.

Political analyst Fred Siegel summarized Ferrer's campaign as follows:
If anyone doubted the hapless nature of Ferrer's campaign they had only to watch his ads featuring the rotund Reverend Al Sharpton salsa dancing. In Fernando Ferrer's losing bid for mayor, that was about as innovative as things got.  The campaign was also plagued by revenue problems as the ads they wished to use were too long and hence too expensive and these "salsa" ads were done to save money but also to hopefully get the campaign some needed attention. Sadly, the focus became Al Sharpton and the others used in these ads rather than the message they tried to convey.

Ferrer's campaign was hurt when the New York Times and other big newspapers endorsed Mike Bloomberg. Also, Ferrer's campaign relied mainly on small contributions, compared to Bloomberg's $96 million from his personal billion dollar fortune.

Bloomberg defeated Ferrer, 58.4%-39.0%, on Election Day. Polls taken just days before had indicated that Ferrer would lose by between 30 and 35 percent.

MTA Chairman
Andrew Cuomo appointed Ferrer to run the MTA as interim Chairman on three separate occasions.

Personal life
As of 2005, Ferrer resided in the Riverdale section of the Bronx.

See also

 Timeline of the Bronx
 List of Puerto Ricans

References

|-

|-

|-

|-

|-

1950 births
1992 United States presidential electors
American people of Catalan descent
American politicians of Puerto Rican descent
Baruch College alumni
Bronx borough presidents
Cardinal Spellman High School (New York City) alumni
Hispanic and Latino American politicians
Living people
New York (state) Democrats
New York University alumni
People from Riverdale, Bronx
Politicians from the Bronx
Puerto Rican people in New York (state) politics
Candidates in the 2005 United States elections
20th-century American politicians
21st-century American politicians
Candidates in the 1997 United States elections
Candidates in the 2001 United States elections